William K. Gayler is a retired United States Army major general who last served as the Chief of Staff of the United States Africa Command from July 2020 to June 2021. Previously, he served as the Director of Operations of the United States Africa Command. Gayler earned a bachelor's degree in marketing from North Georgia College in 1988. He later received a master's degree in military arts and sciences from the Army Command and General Staff College and a second master's degree in national security strategy from the National War College.

References

External links

Year of birth missing (living people)
Living people
Place of birth missing (living people)
University of North Georgia alumni
American Master Army Aviators
United States Army Command and General Staff College alumni
National War College alumni
United States Army generals